These are the official results of the Men's 50 km Walk event at the 1997 World Championships held on Thursday 7 August 1997 in Athens, Greece. There were a total number of 42 participating athletes.

Medalists

Abbreviations
All times shown are in hours:minutes:seconds

Intermediates

Final ranking

See also
 1994 Men's European Championships 50km Walk (Helsinki)
 1996 Men's Olympic 50km Walk (Atlanta)
 1998 Men's European Championships 50km Walk (Budapest)

References
 Results

W
Racewalking at the World Athletics Championships